Alixan is a commune in the Drôme department in southeastern France. Valence TGV station, in the west of the commune, has rail connections to Valence, Grenoble, Paris, Lyon, Marseille, Montpellier and several other destinations.

Population

See also
Communes of the Drôme department

References

Communes of Drôme
Dauphiné